Charles Anderson Read (born 1841, Sligo, Ireland; d.1878, Surrey, England) was an Irish journalist, novelist and anthologist.

Life
He was born to a landowning family near Sligo. He had a business in Rathfriland, County Down, but when it failed he moved to London, becoming a journalist.

He produced numerous sketches, poems, short tales, and nine novels. Two much-acclaimed novels were Savourneen Dheelish (1869) and Aileen Aroon (1870). The former dealt with the same episode as William Carleton's short story Wildgoose Lodge, i.e. the Wildgoose Lodge Murders of 1816. Before his death, in Surrey in 1878, he had completed three of four projected volumes of The Cabinet of Irish Literature. The final volume was edited by T. P. O'Connor.

Select bibliography
Love's Service
Savourneen Dheelish (1869)
Aileen Aroon (1870)
The Cabinet of Irish Literature (3 volumes) (1876–1878)

References

External links
 

Irish poets
People from County Sligo
1841 births
1878 deaths
19th-century poets